Kizhakkum Merkkum is a 1998 Tamil-language drama film directed by Kalanjiyam. The film stars Napoleon, Nassar, Devayani and Geetha, with Manivannan, Thalaivasal Vijay, Vichithra, Theni Kunjarammal, Kalyanjiyam, and Chaplin Balu playing supporting roles. It was released on 14 January 1998.

Plot

Suryamurthy (Napoleon) and Thillai (Geetha) are siblings. They were expelled from their home by their stepmother Chinnamma (Theni Kunjarammal) at a young age. The siblings worked hard to come up in life.

Many years later, Suryamurthy looks for a groom for his sister and finds Kathalingam (Nassar), who is from another village. So Suryamurthy inquires the villagers about Kathalingam's character, and everyone praised Kathalingam, but they lied. Kathalingam is actually a bad person and drunkard, and he has an affair with the village belle Valli (Vichithra). Without knowing the truth, Kathalingam and Thillai get married. Finally, Thillai and Suryamurthy realize that Kathalingam is a bad person, but it was too late.

In the meantime, Suryamurthy and Kathalingam's sister Mallika (Devayani) fall in love with each other; however, Thillai warns him about the consequence of this love on her married life. After a misunderstanding, Mallika begins to hate the honest Suryamurthy. When Kathalingam prepares the wedding between Mallika and a well-educated groom, the wedding is cancelled. The groom's family refuses to marry the bride, who had an affair with Suryamurthy. Kathalingam gets angry and brutally beats Thillai in front of her brother. Suryamurthy begs him to leave her in peace, but Kathalingam refuses, and Suryamurthy is forced to beat Kathalingam in turn. Suryamurthy cannot bear the pain endured by his sister and kidnaps Mallika to stop this cruelty. Kathalingam decides to live with Valli. What transpires next forms the rest of the story.

Cast

Napoleon as Suryamurthy
Nassar as Kathalingam
Devayani as Mallika
Geetha as Thillai
Manivannan as Villager
Thalaivasal Vijay as Ganesan
Vichithra as Valli
Theni Kunjarammal as Chinnamma
Kalanjiyam as Muthukumar
Chaplin Balu as Chinnarasu
G. M. Sundar
Meendum Sundar
Devaki
Tamilselvi
Radhasri
Padma

Awards

1998 Tamil Nadu State Film Awards
Tamil Nadu State Film Award for Best Film Portraying Woman in Good Light
Tamil Nadu State Film Award for Best Lyricist – Arivumathi

Soundtrack

The film score and the soundtrack were composed by Ilaiyaraaja. The soundtrack, released in 1998, features 8 tracks with lyrics written by Arivumathi, Pazhani Bharathi and Vaasan.

Reception
Indolink.com gave the film a positive review praising the lead actors of the film and citing that the film was a "must watch".

References

1998 films
Indian drama films
Films scored by Ilaiyaraaja
1990s Tamil-language films
Films directed by Kalanjiyam